Marquee Sports Network is a regional sports network operated by Sinclair Broadcast Group and the Chicago Cubs, launched on February 22, 2020. It is devoted exclusively to Cubs baseball, replacing a trio of channels (cable channel NBC Sports Chicago and broadcast partners WLS-TV and WGN-TV) as the exclusive broadcaster of Cubs games not shown on national TV.

History 

On November 16, 2015, in an interview with WSCR radio, the Cubs' president of business operations Crane Kenney stated that the team was seeking to launch its own in-house regional sports network after its current broadcast contracts with NBC Sports Chicago, WGN Sports, and WLS-TV expire after the 2019 season.

On December 18, 2018, it was reported by the Chicago Sun-Times that the team was preparing to launch its RSN, "Marquee", in 2020, and that Sinclair Broadcast Group was a frontrunner to serve as managing partner. Sinclair had previously attempted to purchase WGN's parent company Tribune Media, and runs the national sports network Stadium with the White Sox's investment arm Silver Chalice. The venture was officially announced in February 2019 to be launched in 2020 with Sinclair.

On May 22, 2019, Michael McCarthy was named general manager of the Marquee Sports Network after being the Cubs' consultant on the channel. He is the former president of the MSG Network and a former top official with the Milwaukee Bucks (COO) and the St. Louis Blues (vice chairman).

On August 22, 2019, a consortium of Sinclair and Entertainment Studios acquired Fox Sports Networks for $10.6 billion, thus making Marquee a sister to them (FSN previously operated a Chicago network, but it became defunct when Chicago's professional teams abandoned it in favor of a joint venture with Comcast—currently known as NBC Sports Chicago). The divestiture was mandated as part of Disney's acquisition of 21st Century Fox, who chose not to retain the networks under its successor Fox Corporation.

Early reception of Marquee was mixed by fans, culminating in fans booing Cubs chairman Tom Ricketts during the annual Cubs Convention in 2020 after mention of the new network.

Marquee Sports Network officially launched on February 22, 2020, at 1 p.m. CT, with its first program being a launch special hosted by actor and Cubs fan Bill Murray, followed by a documentary on Ernie Banks. The channel aired its first live spring training game against the Oakland Athletics at Sloan Park later in the day; the game had been postponed from the afternoon due to the threat of rain. However, because the start of the season was postponed due to the COVID-19 pandemic, its first regular-season game was not until July 24, 2020.

Marquee's Cubs broadcasts underwent tweaks for the 2021 season. Alongside its new play-by-play voice Jon Sciambi, the network would no longer require commentators to wear a suit and tie on-air (a mandate made during the inaugural season by executives insisting that Marquee's broadcasts have a "national network quality"), and replaced an unorthodox bottom-centered score bar it had used during the first season with a more traditional scoreboard in the top-left of the screen (a move which also differentiated Marquee from its newly-relaunched sister networks in the Bally Sports group, whose on-air branding was derived from that of Marquee, but with an equally-unorthodox integration of a scoreboard and ticker).

The network would use the slogan "We get it" in a marketing campaign to promote the new Cubs season and these tweaks.

Talent 
The Cubs' previous television commentators Len Kasper (play-by-play) and Jim "J.D." Deshaies (color) retained their roles on Marquee at the channel's launch. On May 1, 2019, it was reported that David Kaplan—NBC Sports Chicago studio host for Cubs games—had renewed his contract with the channel, dispelling rumors that he planned to join Marquee. Cole Wright, formerly of NFL Network, was to serve as studio host, and Taylor McGregor, formerly field reporter for the Colorado Rockies on AT&T SportsNet Rocky Mountain, was to serve as field reporter. The channel also brought on Bob Vorwald, former executive producer of WGN Sports.

After the 2020 season, Kasper left the Cubs and Marquee to become the radio voice of the Chicago White Sox on WMVP. Jon Sciambi, then a television and radio play-by-play voice on ESPN's MLB national broadcasts, was hired to replace Kasper. Chris Myers, Beth Mowins, and longtime Cubs radio broadcaster Pat Hughes will act as fill-in announcers when Sciambi is not available.

Programming 
Besides game broadcasts, Marquee will carry documentaries, game replays and player profiles, as well as coverage of minor league games. The channel might attempt to pick up college basketball for the winter time. Stadium and the Bally Sports networks would provide some programming.

Individual programs
Cubs Live, pre-game 
Cubs Postgame Live
Follow The Money, weekday morning sports betting show by Vegas Stats & Information Network hosted by Mitch Moss and Pauly Howard
a unnamed local Chicago sports talk show produced by Stadium, a network partly owned by Sinclair

Baseball team rights
Chicago Cubs 
Iowa Cubs (Class AAA) International League
South Bend Cubs (Class A) Midwest League

Non baseball programming
Marquee Sports Network is an affiliate of the ACC on Regional Sports Networks package, airing select games especially during the baseball offseason. The network also carries select college sports programming from Stadium especially college football and college basketball. The network also has a contract with Illinois State University to air select college football and college basketball games. Select Chicago Sky Games are also available on Marquee.

Broadcasting areas 
Marquee is broadcast in five states, particularly Illinois (with the exception of Southern Illinois), most of Iowa, eastern Nebraska, all of Indiana except areas near the Ohio River, and Kenosha County, Wisconsin. The broadcasting areas for each state are listed below.

Illinois
 Chicago metropolitan area (Cook County, DeKalb County, DuPage County, Grundy County, Kankakee County, Kane County, Kendall County, Lake County, McHenry County, Will County)
 Rockford metropolitan area (Boone County, Ogle County, Stephenson County, Winnebago County)
 Dixon, IL micropolitan area (Lee County) 
 Quad Cities metropolitan area (Rock Island County, Fulton County, Henry County, Carroll County, Mercer County)
 Galesburg, Illinois micropolitan area (Knox County, Warren County)
 Macomb, IL micropolitan area (McDonough County)
 Peoria metropolitan area (Marshall County, Peoria County, Stark County, Tazewell County, Woodford County)
 Bloomington, Illinois Metropolitan (McLean County)
 Champaign Metropolitan area (Champaign County, Ford County, Piatt County)
 Decatur, IL Metropolitan Statistical Area (Macon County)
 Springfield metropolitan area (Menard County, Sangamon County)

Indiana
 Chicago metropolitan area (Jasper County, Lake County, Newton County, Porter County)
 South Bend–Mishawaka metropolitan area (St. Joseph County)
 Elkhart-Goshen Metropolitan Statistical Area (Elkhart County, Indiana)
 Warsaw Micropolitan area (Kosciusko County)
 Fort Wayne metropolitan area (Adams County, Allen County, DeKalb County, Huntington County, Noble County, Wells County, Whitley County)
 Logansport micropolitan area (Cass County)
 Lafayette metropolitan area (Benton County, Carroll County, Tippecanoe County)
 Frankfort micropolitan area (Clinton County)
 Indianapolis metropolitan area (Boone County, Brown County, Hamilton County, Hancock County, Johnson County, Madison County,  Marion County, Morgan County, Putnam County, Shelby County)
 Bloomington metropolitan area (Greene County, Monroe County, Owen County)
 Terre Haute metropolitan area (Clay County, Sullivan County, Vermillion County, Vigo County)

Iowa
 Iowa City metropolitan area (Johnson County)
 Quad Cities metropolitan area (Scott County, Muscatine County, Cedar County, Clinton County, Jackson County)
 Dubuque, Iowa metropolitan area (Dubuque County)
 Waterloo metropolitan area (Black Hawk County, Bremer County, Buchanan County, Butler County, Chickasaw County, Grundy County)
 Cedar Rapids metropolitan area (Benton County, Jones County, Linn County)
 Fort Dodge, IA micropolitan area (Webster County)
 Burlington, Iowa micropolitan area (Des Moines)
 Fairfield, Iowa micropolitan area (Jefferson County
 Ottumwa, Iowa mircopolitan area (Wapello County, Davis County)
 Ames, Iowa metropolitan area (Story County)
 Des Moines metropolitan area (Dallas County, Guthrie County, Jasper County, Madison County, Polk, Warren County)
 Omaha–Council Bluffs metropolitan area (Harrison County, Mills County, Pottawattamie County)
 Sioux City metropolitan area (Plymouth County, Woodbury County)

Michigan
 South Bend–Mishawaka metropolitan area (Cass County)

Nebraska
 Sioux City metropolitan area (Burt County, Cuming County, Dakota County, Dixon County, Stanton County, Wayne County)
 Omaha–Council Bluffs metropolitan area (Cass County, Douglas County, Sarpy County, Saunders County, Washington County)
 Lincoln, Nebraska metropolitan area (Lancaster County, Seward County)
 Grand Island metropolitan area (Hall County, Hamilton County, Howard County, Merrick County)
 Kearney Micropolitan area (Buffalo County, Kearney County)

Wisconsin
 Chicago metropolitan area (Kenosha County)

Carriage 
As of February 2020, Sinclair had secured distribution deals with Charter Communications, RCN, DirecTV, Mediacom, and Frontier Communications to carry Marquee Sports Network at launch.

Upon the announcement of the channel, the network's ability to gain carriage was compared to the troubled negotiations of the Los Angeles Dodgers' SportsNet LA. Industry observer Phillip Swan thought Marquee would have a "50-50 chance of working" while commenting "How can you not look at the disaster of the SportsNet (LA) scene and not be a little skeptical?" Charter has since come to terms with DirecTV to carry SportsNet LA.

Industry experts predicted that Marquee would seek around $5 per subscriber placing it behind YES Network and ESPN. Sinclair secured Marquee's first major carriage agreement with Charter Communications on July 11, 2019. As part of the multi-year carriage agreement, Marquee was bundled alongside Sinclair's owned-and-operated television stations, Tennis Channel and the regional Fox Sports Networks that Sinclair was in the process of buying from Disney at the time.

On October 17, 2019, AT&T agreed to carry Marquee on its television services (including DirecTV, the second largest provider serving the region behind Comcast) as part of a larger, multi-year carriage agreement with Sinclair. Sinclair later reached a deal with Mediacom on November 6, 2019, to carry Marquee Sports Network. On February 17, 2020, the network announced an agreement to carry the network on Hulu's live streaming service. On February 27, the network announced an agreement with WOW cable.

Comcast, the largest television provider in the region (with an estimated 1.5 million subscribers), reached an agreement to carry Marquee on July 24 (in time for the Cubs' opening game) as part of a larger renewal for Sinclair-owned television stations and cable networks.

Until May 2022, Marquee's deal with DirecTV was for in-market coverage only. Unlike many other regional sports networks, Marquee was not included in DirecTV's Sports Pack, which carries RSNs nationwide with appropriate blackouts of professional events. That changed May 9, 2022, with the announcement that Marquee would be available nationwide with the Sports Pack, albeit with the appropriate blackouts.

Dish Network and YouTube TV (which has indicated they have no deal for Marquee's sister RSNs after February 29 and would remove them from the platform on that date) have not reached an agreement with Sinclair to carry Marquee Sports Network.

Additionally, Marquee also has the rights to the games for the Cubs' Minor League Baseball clubs, including Des Moines's Iowa Cubs and the South Bend Cubs, ending deals with local broadcast subchannels to leverage Iowa and northern Indiana cable systems into carrying the network.

References

External links
 

Chicago Cubs
Sinclair Broadcast Group
Major League Baseball broadcasters
Ricketts family
Television stations in Chicago
Television channels and stations established in 2020
Bally Sports